Thomas Waltham (fl. 1379–1388), of Kingston upon Hull, Yorkshire, was an English politician.

Family
Waltham had a wife named Katharine.

Career
Waltham was Mayor of Kingston upon Hull from 1385 to 1386. He was a Member (MP) of the Parliament of England for Kingston upon Hull in 1379, February 1383 and September 1388.

References

Year of birth missing
Year of death missing
English MPs 1379
Politicians from Kingston upon Hull
Mayors of Kingston upon Hull
English MPs February 1383
English MPs September 1388